The United States vs. Billie Holiday is a 2021 American biographical drama film about singer Billie Holiday, based on the book Chasing the Scream: The First and Last Days of the War on Drugs by Johann Hari. Directed by Lee Daniels, the film stars Andra Day in the titular role, along with Trevante Rhodes, Garrett Hedlund, Leslie Jordan (in his final film appearance), Miss Lawrence, Adriane Lenox, Natasha Lyonne, Rob Morgan, Da'Vine Joy Randolph, Evan Ross, and Tyler James Williams.

Initially set to be released theatrically in the United States by Paramount Pictures, the film was sold to Hulu in December 2020 and digitally released in the United States on February 26, 2021. The United States vs. Billie Holiday received mixed reviews from critics; while Day's performance was praised, the direction and screenplay were criticized as unfocused. For her performance, Day was nominated for the Academy Award for Best Actress and won the Golden Globe Award for Best Actress – Motion Picture Drama. The film was also nominated for the Golden Globe Award for Best Original Song ("Tigress and Tweed") and the soundtrack won the Grammy Award for Best Compilation Soundtrack for Visual Media, for Andra Day, Salaam Remi, and Lynn Fainchtein.

Plot 
In 1957, Billie Holiday meets with a radio journalist, Reginald Lord Devine, for an interview. He asks her what it is like to be a "colored woman" and about the trouble she keeps getting into because of her hit song Strange Fruit. Billie says it is about human rights, something the government often forgets.

In 1947, Billie's husband Monroe and her manager Joe Glaser try to get Billie to cut Strange Fruit from her set list, saying people high up in the government do not want to hear her sing it. Lester Young, Billie's sax player, supports her in playing it.

FBI agent Harry J. Anslinger tells other agents that Billie is a threat, her song promotes the wrong ideas, and she has not stopped singing it. Unable to arrest her for singing, they decide to go after her on drug charges. After Billie's next show, Agent Jimmy Fletcher, disguised as a soldier, witnesses her doing drugs. The FBI arrest Billie and her lover Joe Guy for drug use and possession. The judge sentences Billie to a year in jail. It is later revealed that Anslinger paid off Guy.

Anslinger tells Jimmy that they need to make sure Billie never sings again. Jimmy questions why Billie is such a problem. Anslinger tells Fletcher to go to the prison to get back in with Billie. Instead, he tells her to not trust anyone and warns her the FBI will continue to try to set her up.

After Billie is released from prison, she does a Carnegie Hall show where an audience member asks her to sing Strange Fruit and she sadly declines. Billie meets John Levy, who tells her that he will pay off the right people to make sure she can keep singing in his clubs. They begin a relationship. Levy proposes to her, then slips drugs into her pocket just in time for the FBI to enter. In court, Fletcher admits that Billie was possibly framed, and she is freed. Anslinger sends Fletcher to follow Billie on her tour.

In 1949, Jimmy comes to see Billie after a successful tour stop and tells her the agency wants her to think he was fired. Suspicious, the whole crew has Jimmy do heroin to show he can be trusted. Over the course of the tour, Jimmy and Billie fall in love. One day, after the bus breaks down, Billie breaks up with Jimmy, telling him he needs to find a nice girl, and that is not her. Jimmy returns to work, where he finds he has been replaced.

Billie marries Louis McKay, later returning to Jimmy. Later, Billie tells Jimmy she has liver failure. In the hospital, Anslinger tells Billie and McKay that if she cooperates, she will never see them again. Billie tells him that his grandkids will be singing Strange Fruit one day.

Cast

Production
Development on a new Billie Holiday biopic was announced in September 2019, with Lee Daniels directing. Andra Day was set to play the titular role, with Trevante Rhodes, Garrett Hedlund and Natasha Lyonne also cast. Evan Ross, Dana Gourrier and Erik LaRay Harvey were also added later that month. Additional casting was announced in October. Daniels was hesitant to cast Day, owing to her limited acting experience, but became convinced following an iPhone clip of her sent to him by her acting coach.

Filming began on October 6, 2019, in Montreal.

Andra Day revealed that she lost almost 40 pounds and started drinking and smoking to portray Billie Holiday in this film.

Soundtrack

Release
The film was released on February 26, 2021. In July 2020, Paramount Pictures acquired distribution rights to the film. It was originally scheduled to be released on February 12, 2021, but in November 2020, it was moved two weeks to February 26. In December 2020, Hulu acquired distribution rights to the film in the United States.

Reception

Audience viewership 
Hulu reported the film was the most-watched title over its first three days of release, with Samba TV estimating that 287,000 U.S. households watched the film.

Critical response
Review aggregator website Rotten Tomatoes reported that 55% of 185 critic reviews were positive, with an average rating of 5.4/10. The website's critics consensus reads, "Although The United States vs. Billie Holiday often falls shy of its subject's transcendence, Andra Day's performance offers brilliant compensation." On Metacritic the film has a weighted average score of 52 out of 100, based on 43 critics, indicating "mixed or average reviews".

David Rooney of The Hollywood Reporter wrote, "Day mesmerizes even when Lee Daniels' unwieldy bio-drama careens all over the map with stylistic inconsistency and narrative dysfunction, settling for episodic electricity in the absence of a robust connective thread. It's a mess, albeit an absorbing one, driven by a raw central performance of blistering indignation, both tough and vulnerable." Reviewing for Variety, Owen Gleiberman praised Day's performance and said, "In this sprawling, lacerating, but at times emotionally wayward biopic set during the last decade of Holiday's life, Day gives Billie a voice of pearly splendor that, over time, turns raspy and hard, and we see the same thing happening to Billie inside."

For Deadline Hollywood, Pete Hammond wrote, "You simply cannot say enough about what Day achieves in this role, particularly being a first-time actor. She gets beneath the skin of Holiday, giving a raw and honest portrait of an artist under duress but determined in her belief that she can use that art and talent to make the world a more just place." Peter Bradshaw of The Guardian gave the film 2 out of 5 stars, detailing, "Day's rendition is heartfelt. But the direction and storytelling are laborious, without the panache and incorrectness of earlier Daniels movies such as Precious (2009) and The Paperboy (2012). A cloud of solemnity and reverence hangs over it, briefly dispelled by the music itself." DiscussingFilm also praised Day in their 3/5 review, saying that her work is the only memorable aspect in an otherwise forgettable, muddled film.

Several jazz critics and musicians have had negative reactions to the film for its rewriting of history. Writing in JazzTimes, historian and musician Lewis Porter critiqued the ahistorical premise of the film: In Lee Daniels’ film The United States vs. Billie Holiday, the words “Earle Theater, Philadelphia, May 27, 1947” flash onscreen, and one sees a row of policemen, with Holiday’s manager Joe Glaser standing at the center of them. Billie comes onstage and sings the first words of “Strange Fruit,” solo. Immediately, Glaser orders the police, “Get her off that stage!” and they storm forward.

But wait! Holiday was not at the Earle Theater on that date. She never sang “Strange Fruit” as the first number in a set, and never sang that or anything else a cappella . . . Most significant, never in her entire career was Billie stopped while performing “Strange Fruit.” Yes, the Federal Bureau of Narcotics pursued Holiday for her drug use. But there was no federal objection to the song “Strange Fruit,” nor was there any campaign to suppress it.

If you believed this film—and so far as I can tell, almost everyone did, even the many critics who rightly panned it—you have been the victim of one of the worst instances of rewriting history in the annals of Hollywood. Even the usual spate of articles about “what's true in this based-on-fact movie” missed the boat. The Los Angeles Times stated that “[a]lthough some details of the relationships have been fictionalized ..., the ... conspiracies are well documented.” Documented where exactly? In the movie, and nowhere else.In their Jazz United podcast on WBGO, critic Nate Chinen and musician and radio host Greg Bryant also objected the film's false premises but also its let down to the jazz community for its inauthenticity and "exploitative nature", saying, for example "its the attempt to co-opt the name to sell films, what we have again what we have is the image of jazz, of black American music, whichever you call it, being used to promoted certain stereotypes not only about the music, but the players, the people, who gave their lives to embody it."

Accolades

See also
 Lady Sings the Blues – A 1972 biopic of Billie Holiday, starring Diana Ross.
 Lady Day at Emerson's Bar and Grill – A 1986 play and 2016 television movie, starring Audra McDonald.

References

External links
 
 
 The United States vs. Billie Holiday at History vs. Hollywood
 Official screenplay

2021 biographical drama films
American biographical drama films
Biographical films about singers
Cultural depictions of Billie Holiday
Films about the Federal Bureau of Investigation
Films about heroin addiction
Films directed by Lee Daniels
Films featuring a Best Drama Actress Golden Globe-winning performance
Films scored by Kris Bowers
Films set in the 1940s
Films set in the 1950s
Films set in New York City
Films shot in Montreal
Hulu original films
2020s English-language films
2020s American films